Alfred or Alf Wilson may refer to:

 Alf Wilson (English footballer) (1890–after 1919), English footballer
 Alf Wilson (Australian footballer) (1902–1984), Australian rules footballer
 Alf Wilson (boxer) (1909–?), South African Olympic boxer
 Alfred Wilson (rower) (1903–1989), American Olympic rower
Alfred Wilson, Baron Wilson of Radcliffe (1909–1983), British Co-operative movement figure and life peer
 Alfred L. Wilson (1919–1944), U.S. Army soldier and Medal of Honor recipient in World War II
 Alfred M. Wilson (1948–1969), U.S. Marine and Medal of Honor recipient in the Vietnam War
 Alfred Wilson (cricketer) (1828–1908), English cricketer and barrister
 Alfred Wilson (rugby union) (1904–1985), Scottish rugby union player
 A. Jeyaratnam Wilson (1928–2000), Sri Lankan Tamil academic, historian and author
 Alfred Roscoe Wilson (1882–1964), Anglican Dean of Melbourne

See also
Al Wilson (disambiguation)